Zygmunt Stanisław Marek (born March 17, 1872 in Kraków, died 1931 in Kraków) was a Polish socialist politician.

After graduating from gymnasium he studied law. He joined the Polish Social Democratic Party of Galicia (PPSD) in 1890.  Marek was a chief editor of the newspaper ‘'Więzien polityczny (Political prisoner) and Naprzód'' (Forward) during World War I.  In 1919, after Poland regained independence after years of partitions, he joined the united Polish Socialist Party (PPS).

Elected Sejm member the same year, he became chairman of the PPS caucus, replacing Norbert Barlicki in 1926. On May 31, 1926 he nominated Józef Piłsudski for President. Piłsudski was elected by National Assembly for this post, but decided against taking office. As a result PPS drafted their own candidate in next election, held on June 1, and Marek became a nominee. He faced Piłsudski-backed chemistry professor Ignacy Mościcki and Poznań Voivode Adolf Bniński, who represented the right wing. In the first round he placed last with 56 votes (against 215 for Mościcki and 211 for Bniński). In the runoff he finished last again, with just one vote (Mościcki defeated Bniński 281 to 200).

Marek served as a Sejm Vice-Marshal from 1928 to 1931. He was the father of Krystyna Marek, Polish-Swiss professor of public international law.

See also
 1926 Polish presidential elections

1872 births
1931 deaths
Politicians from Kraków
People from the Kingdom of Galicia and Lodomeria
Polish Austro-Hungarians
Polish Social Democratic Party of Galicia politicians
Polish Socialist Party politicians
Members of the House of Deputies (Austria)
Deputy Marshals of the Sejm of the Second Polish Republic
Members of the Legislative Sejm of the Second Polish Republic
Members of the Sejm of the Second Polish Republic (1922–1927)
Members of the Sejm of the Second Polish Republic (1928–1930)
Members of the Sejm of the Second Polish Republic (1930–1935)
Candidates for President of Poland